Jomthong Chuwattana is a Thai Muay Thai kickboxer. He is the WBC Muaythai Featherweight Champion and 3 times Rajadamnern Stadium Champion.

As of 24 July 2017, he is ranked the #5 lightweight in the world by LiverKick.com.

Biography
Jomthong Chuwattana (จอมทอง ชูวัฒนะ) was born as Thanakorn Pawachart (ธนากร พวาชาติ) in Maha Chana Chai District, Yasothon Province in Northeastern region of Thailand. He had his first fight at the age of 8.

Jomthong is a young and talented fighter from the Chuwattana camp in Thailand. Making his name by defeating the famous Anuwat Kaewsamrit, Jomthong captured two of the most prestigious titles in Muaythai.

Career
Jomthong is currently one of the best Muaythai Champions on the circuit. In 2004 he became at only 15 years, Rajadamnern Stadium Champion. In 2006 he was awarded the title of best fighter of the year after winning another Rajadamnern Stadium title versus Anuwat and it also becomes WMC World Champion. This young formidable fighter has cleaned up its category in 2007 and 2008, losing in front of the star Saenchai Sor Kingstar.

He knocked out Deng Zeqi in round one at MAX Muay Thai 3 in Zhengzhou, China on August 10, 2013.

For professional boxing Jomthong has a record of nine wins in a row and has challenged the WBA Super Featherweight world championship with the undefeated Japanese title holder Takashi Uchiyama at Ota City General Gymnasium, Tokyo, Japan on May 6, 2015, he was quickly defeated by TKO in the early second round.

Titles and accomplishments

Boxing
2012 OPBF Super Featherweight Champion (130 lbs) (2nd title defence)
2012 ABCO Continental Super Featherweight Champion (130 lbs)
2012  WBC All Asia Super Featherweight Champion (130 lbs)

Kickboxing
Kunlun Fight
2016 Kunlun Fight World Max Tournament Runner-up

Muay Thai
Rajadamnern Stadium
2020 Rajadamnern Stadium 147 lbs Champion
2010 Rajadamnern Stadium 130 lbs Champion (1 defense) 
2009 Rajadamnern Stadium Fighter of the Year
2009 Rajadamnern Stadium 126 lbs Champion
2006 Rajadamnern Stadium 126 lbs Champion
2004 Rajadamnern Stadium 118 lbs Champion

World Boxing Council Muaythai
2012 WBC Muay Thai World Lightweight Champion (135 lbs / 61.235 kg) (1 title defence)
2011 WBC Muay Thai World Lightweight Champion (135 lbs / 61.235 kg)
2009 WBC Muay Thai World Featherweight Champion (126 lbs / 57.153 kg) (1 title defence)
2008 WBC Muay Thai World Featherweight Champion (126 lbs / 57.153 kg)
World Muay Thai Council
2006 WMC World Featherweight (-57 kg) Champion

Awards
2006 Sports Writers Association of Thailand Fighter of the Year
2012 WBC Asia Fight of the year (2012-11-24 vs. Ranel Suco)

Professional Boxing record

|-
|9
|Loss
|8–1
|style="text-align:left;"| Takashi Uchiyama
|
|2 (12)||
|6 May 2015
|style="text-align:left;"| 
|style="text-align:left;"|
|-
|8
|Win
|8–0
|style="text-align:left;"| Daiki Kaneko
|
|12 (12)||
|17 Jan 2015
|style="text-align:left;"| 
|style="text-align:left;"|
|-
|7
|Win
|7–0
|style="text-align:left;"| Koseki Nakama	
|
|12 (12)||
|24 Aug 2014
|style="text-align:left;"| 
|style="text-align:left;"|
|-
|6
|Win
|6–0
|style="text-align:left;"| Mike Tumbaga
|
|8 (8)||
|31 Mar 2013
|style="text-align:left;"| 
|
|-
|5
|Win
|5–0
|style="text-align:left;"| Ronald Pontillas
|
|12 (12)||
|08 Feb 2013
|style="text-align:left;"| 
|style="text-align:left;"|
|-
|4
|Win
|4–0
|style="text-align:left;"| Ranel Suco	
|
|12 (12)||
|24 Nov 2012
|style="text-align:left;"| 
|style="text-align:left;"|
|-
|3
|Win
|3–0
|style="text-align:left;"| Dong Hyuk Kim
|
|9 (12)||
|28 May 2012
|style="text-align:left;"| 
|style="text-align:left;"|
|-
|2
|Win
|2–0
|style="text-align:left;"| Yuya Sugizaki
|
|3 (6)||
|23 Feb 2011
|style="text-align:left;"| 
|
|-
|1
|Win
|1–0
|style="text-align:left;"| Chartthai Chumpairtour
|
|1 (6)||
|07 Mar 2010
|style="text-align:left;"| 
|
|-
| colspan=10 |  Legend:

Muay Thai & Kickboxing record

|- style="background:#fbb;"
| 2023-03-12 || Loss ||align=left| Hiromi Wajima || K-1 World GP 2023: K'Festa 6 || Tokyo, Japan || TKO (Corner stoppage) || 4 || 0:25
|-
! style=background:white colspan=9 |

|-  style="text-align:center; background:#cfc;"
| 2022-12-03 || Win ||align=left| Naoki Morita ||  K-1 World GP 2022 in Osaka || Osaka, Japan || KO (Left straight) || 2 || 0:22

|-  style="text-align:center; background:#cfc;"
| 2022-09-11 || Win || align=left| Abiral Ghimire ||  K-1 World GP 2022 Yokohamatsuri  || Yokohama, Japan || KO (High kick)||  1||3:02
|-  style="background:#cfc;"
| 2020-01-05 || Win||align=left| Petchnarin Kluarae1T || Rajadamnern Stadium || Bangkok, Thailand || KO || 3 || 
|-
! style=background:white colspan=9 |

|-  style="background:#fbb;"
| 2019-10-16 || Loss ||align=left| Saenpon PetchpacharaAcademy || Rajadamnern Stadium || Bangkok, Thailand || Decision  || 5 || 3:00
|-  style="background:#fbb;"
| 2019-09-19 || Loss ||align=left| Saenpon PetchpacharaAcademy || Rajadamnern Stadium || Bangkok, Thailand || Decision  || 5 || 3:00
|-  style="background:#CCFFCC;"
| 2019-08-18|| Win||align=left| Hinata || K.O CLIMAX 2019 SUMMER KICK FEVER || Tokyo, Japan || Decision || 3 || 3:00
|-  style="background:#CCFFCC;"
| 2019-06-27 || Win ||align=left| Felipe Lobo || Rajadamnern Stadium || Bangkok, Thailand || Decision  || 5 || 3:00
|-  style="background:#CCFFCC;"
| 2019-05-16 || Win ||align=left| Sakmongkol Sor.Sommai || Rajadamnern Stadium || Bangkok, Thailand || KO || 3 ||
|-  style="background:#fbb;"
| 2019-01-19 || Loss ||align=left| Petchtanong Banchamek ||Wu Lin Feng 2019: WLF World Cup 2018-2019 Final, Final  || Haikou, China || Decision (Unanimous) || 3 || 3:00
|-
|-  style="background:#cfc;"
| 2019-01-19 || Win ||align=left| Hasan Toy ||Wu Lin Feng 2019: WLF World Cup 2018-2019 Final, Semi Finals  || Haikou, China || Decision (Unanimous) || 3 || 3:00
|-
|-  style="background:#cfc;"
| 2018-11-03 || Win ||align=left| Meng Qinghao|| Wu Lin Feng 2018: WLF -67kg World Cup 2018-2019 5th Round || China || Decision  || 3 || 3:00
|-  style="background:#fbb;"
| 2018-09-01 || Loss ||align=left| Aleksei Ulianov || Wu Lin Feng 2018: WLF -67kg World Cup 2018-2019 3rd Round || Zhengzhou, China || Decision  || 3 || 3:00
|-  style="background:#cfc;"
| 2018-07-07 || Win ||align=left| Wang Pengfei || Wu Lin Feng 2018: WLF -67kg World Cup 2018-2019 1st Round || Zhengzhou, China || Decision (Unanimous) || 3 || 3:00
|-  style="background:#fbb;"
| 2018-04-28 || Loss ||align=left| Yohann Drai ||  All Star Fight 3 || Bangkok, Thailand || Decision || 3 || 3:00
|-  style="background:#cfc;"
| 2018-04-01 || Win ||align=left| Dzianis Zuev || Kunlun Fight 71 || Qingdao, China || Decision || 3 || 3:00
|-
|-  style="background:#fbb;"
| 2017-08-27 || Loss||align=left| Marat Grigorian || Kunlun Fight 65 - World MAX 2017 Final 16 || Qingdao, China || KO (Right Cross) || 2 || 2:56
|-
|-  style="background:#cfc;"
| 2017-07-15 || Win ||align=left| T-98 || Kunlun Fight 64 Group O Tournament Final || Chongqing, China || TKO (Left Low Kick) || 2 || 
|-
! style=background:white colspan=9 |
|-  style="background:#cfc;"
| 2017-07-15 || Win ||align=left| Cedric Manhoef || Kunlun Fight 64 Group O Tournament Semi-Finals || Chongqing, China || Ex.R Decision (Unanimous) || 4 || 3:00
|-  style="background:#cfc;"
| 2017-06-10 || Win ||align=left| Gabriel Mazzetti || Kunlun Fight 62  || Bangkok, Thailand || Decision (Unanimous) || 3 || 3:00
|-  style="background:#fbb;"
| 2017-04-23 || Loss ||align=left| Artem Pashporin || Kunlun Fight 60 Group G Tournament Final || Guizhou, China || Decision || 3 || 3:00
|-  style="background:#cfc;"
| 2017-04-23 || Win ||align=left| Li Zhuangzhuang || Kunlun Fight 60 Group G Tournament Semi-Finals || Guizhou, China || KO (Left Cross)|| 1 || 2:33
|-  style="background:#fbb;"
| 2017-03-18 || Loss ||align=left| Mohamed Khamal || Enfusion Live 47 || Nijmegen, Netherlands || Decision || 3 || 3:00
|-
|-  style="background:#fbb;"
| 2017-01-01 || Loss ||align=left| Superbon Banchamek || Kunlun Fight 56 - World MAX 2016, Final || Sanya, China || KO (Right Hook) || 3 || 2:40
|-
! style=background:white colspan=9 |
|-  style="background:#cfc;"
| 2017-01-01 || Win ||align=left| Davit Kiria || Kunlun Fight 56 - World MAX 2016, Semi Finals || Sanya, China || Ext. R Decision || 4 || 3:00
|-  style="background:#cfc;"
| 2016-09-24 || Win ||align=left| Tian Xin || Kunlun Fight 53 - World MAX 2016 Final 8 || Beijing, China || Decision (Unanimous) || 3 || 3:00
|-
! style=background:white colspan=9 |
|-  style="background:#cfc;"
| 2016-08-20 || Win ||align=left| Lee Sung-Hyun || Kunlun Fight 50 – World MAX 2016 Final 16 || Jinan, China || Decision (unanimous) || 3 || 3:00
|-
! style=background:white colspan=9 |
|-  style="background:#cfc;"
| 2016-06-05 || Win ||align=left|  Gu Hui || Kunlun Fight 45  - World MAX 2016 Group M Tournament Final  || Chengdu, China || Decision(Unanimous) || 3 || 3:00
|-
! style=background:white colspan=9 |
|-
|-  style="background:#cfc;"
| 2016-06-05 || Win ||align=left|  Warren Stevelmans || Kunlun Fight 45 - World MAX 2016 Group M Tournament Semi Finals  || Chengdu, China || Decision(Unanimous) || 3 || 3:00
|-
|-  style="background:#fbb;"
| 2016-04-02 || Loss ||align=left| Qiu Jianliang || Glory of heroes 1 || Shenzhen, China || Ext. R Decision || 4 || 3:00
|-
|-  style="background:#cfc;"
| 2016-03-06|| Win ||align=left| Eduart Paci || Super Muay Thai  || Bangkok, Thailand || Decision(Unanimous) || 3 || 3:00
|-
|-  style="background:#cfc;"
| 2016-01-23 || Win ||align=left|  Deng Zeqi ||Wu Lin Feng 2016: World Kickboxing Championship in Shanghai  || Shanghai, China || KO (Left Cross) || 1 || 
|-
|-  style="background:#cfc;"
| 2015-12-05|| Win ||align=left| Sergey Kulyaba || Super Muay Thai  || Bangkok, Thailand || Decision(Unanimous) || 3 || 3:00
|-
|-  style="background:#cfc;"
| 2015-08-22 || Win ||align=left|  Xie Lei || Wu Lin Feng || Xiamen, China || Decision || 3 || 3:00
|-
|-  style="background:#fbb;"
| 2015-07-04 || Loss ||align=left| Yang Zhuo || Wu Lin Feng 2015 World 67 kg Tournament, Semi Final || Zhengzhou, China || Ext. R Decision (Split) || 4 || 3:00
|-
|-  style="background:#cfc;"
| 2015-03-07 || Win ||align=left| Qiu Jianliang || Wu Lin Feng 2015 World 67 kg Tournament, Quarter Final || Zhengzhou, China || Decision || 3 || 3:00
|-
! style=background:white colspan=9 |
|-  style="background:#cfc;"
| 2015-03-07 || Win ||align=left| Guo Dongwang || Wu Lin Feng 2015 World 67 kg Tournament Final 16 || Zhengzhou, China || Decision (Unanimous) || 3 || 3:00
|-
|-  style="background:#cfc;"
| 2015-02-12 || Win ||align=left| Denpanom Rongriankilarkorat ||Rajadamnern Stadium || Bangkok, Thailand || TKO || 4 || 
|-  style="background:#cfc;"
| 2014-12-07|| Win ||align=left| Jinreedtong Seattansferry || MAX Muay Thai|| Bangkok, Thailand || Decision || 3 || 3:00
|-
! style=background:white colspan=9 |
|-  style="background:#cfc;"
| 2014-12-07|| Win ||align=left| Adaylton Freitas || MAX Muay Thai|| Bangkok, Thailand || Decision || 3 || 3:00
|-  style="background:#cfc;"
| 2014-08-03 || Win || align=left| Khayal Dzhaniev || Max Muay Thai|| Thailand || KO || 2 || 
|-  style="background:#cfc;"
| 2014-06-08 || Win || align=left| Kamen Picken || Max Muay Thai|| Thailand || KO (elbow) || 1 || 
|-
|-  style="background:#cfc;"
| 2014-03-29 || Win ||align=left| Mike '300' Demetriou || MAX Muay Thai 7 || Bangkok, Thailand || TKO (referee stoppage) || 2 || 
|-
! style=background:white colspan=9 |
|-
|-  style="background:#cfc;"
| 2014-03-29|| Win ||align=left| Naimjon Tuhtaboyev || MAX Muay Thai 7 || Bangkok, Thailand || Decision || 3 || 3:00
|-  style="background:#cfc;"
| 2014-02-16 || Win ||align=left| Tie Yinghua || MAX Muay Thai 6 || Zhengzhou, China || Decision (Unanimous) || 3 || 3:00
|-  style="background:#fbb;"
| 2013-11-06 || Loss ||align=left| Pakorn PKSaenchaimuaythaigym || Rajadamnern Stadium || Bangkok, Thailand || Decision || 5 || 3:00
|-  style="background:#cfc;"
| 2013-08-10 || Win ||align=left| Deng Zeqi || Max Muay Thai 3 || Zhengzhou, China || KO (Knee) || 1 ||
|-  style="background:#cfc;"
| 2012-10-11 || Win ||align=left| Parnphet Chor.Na Patalung || Onesongchai Fight, Rajadamnern Stadium || Bangkok, Thailand || Decision || 5 || 3:00
|-  style="background:#cfc;"
| 2012-08-07 || Win ||align=left| Thongchai Sitsongpeenong|| Fairtex Fight, Lumpinee Stadium || Bangkok, Thailand || TKO (Referee Stoppage) || 3 || 
|-  style="background:#cfc;"
| 2012-06-09 || Win ||align=left| Yetkin Ozkul || WBC Battle of the belts || Bangkok, Thailand || Decision || 5 || 3:00
|-
! style=background:white colspan=9 |
|-
|-  style="background:#fbb;"
| 2012-03-12 || Loss ||align=left| Petchboonchu FA Group || Rajadamnern Stadium || Bangkok, Thailand || Decision || 5 || 3:00
|-  style="background:#cfc;"
| 2012-01-26 || Win ||align=left| Singtongnoi Por.Telakun || Wansongchai Fight, Rajadamnern Stadium || Bangkok, Thailand || Decision || 5 || 3:00
|-  style="background:#fbb;"
| 2011-12-22 || Loss ||align=left| Kongsak sitboonmee || Rajadamnern Stadium || Bangkok, Thailand || Decision || 5 || 3:00
|-  style="background:#cfc;"
| 2011-11-04 || Win ||align=left| Hiromasa Masuda || WBC Muaythai Gala || Bangkok, Thailand || TKO (Referee Stoppage) || 2 || 1:22
|-
! style=background:white colspan=9 |
|-
|-  style="background:#cfc;"
| 2011-10-03 || Win ||align=left| Tetsuya Yamato || WBC Japan, Korakuen Hall || Tokyo, Japan || Decision (Unanimous) || 5 || 3:00
|-  style="background:#fbb;"
| 2011-08-18 || Loss ||align=left| Pakon Sakyothin || Onesongchai promotions, Rajadamnern Stadium || Bangkok, Thailand || Decision || 5 || 3:00
|-  style="background:#cfc;"
| 2011-07-13 || Win ||align=left| Phet-Ek Kiatyongyut || Suek Daorungchujaroen, Rajadamnern Stadium || Bangkok, Thailand || Decision || 5 || 3:00
|-
|-  style="background:#cfc;"
| 2011-06-11 || Win ||align=left| Zhang Junyong || Wushu vs Muaythai || China || KO (Left Lowkick) || 3 || 
|-
|-  style="background:#cfc;"
| 2011-05-05 || Win ||align=left| Nong-O Kaiyanghadaogym || Suek Daorungchujaroen, Rajadamnern Stadium || Bangkok, Thailand || Decision || 5 || 3:00
|-
|-  style="background:#cfc;"
| 2011-03-31 || Win ||align=left| Nong-O Sit Or || Suek Rajadamnern - Lumpinee For Tsunami Japan || Bangkok, Thailand || Decision || 5 || 3:00
|-
|-  style="background:#cfc;"
| 2011-01-31 || Win ||align=left| Tukkatathong Phetphayathai || Suek Daorungchujaroen, Rajadamnern Stadium || Bangkok, Thailand || Decision || 5 || 3:00
|-
! style=background:white colspan=9 |
|-
|-  style="background:#cfc;"
| 2011-01-06 || Win ||align=left| Jaroenchai Aooddonmuang || Suek Daorungchujaroen, Rajadamnern Stadium || Bangkok, Thailand || Decision || 5 || 3:00
|-
|-  style="background:#cfc;"
| 2010-12-18 || Win ||align=left| Li Teng || Bruce Lee 70th Birthday Celebrations || Shun De, China || KO (Knee Strike) || 3 || 
|-
|-  style="background:#fbb;"
| 2010-11-02 || Loss ||align=left| Pakon Sakyothin || Suek Lumpinee-Rajadamnern Special, Lumpinee Stadium || Bangkok, Thailand || Decision || 5 || 3:00
|-
|-  style="background:#cfc;"
| 2010-10-07 || Win ||align=left| Kongnakornban Sor. Kitrungrot || Suek Daorungchujaroen, Rajadamnern Stadium || Bangkok, Thailand || Decision || 5 || 3:00
|-
! style=background:white colspan=9 |
|-
|-  style="background:#fbb;"
| 2010-09-07 || Loss ||align=left| Singtongnoi Por.Telakun || Suek Petsupapan, Lumpinee Stadium || Bangkok, Thailand || Decision || 5 || 3:00
|-
|-  style="background:#fbb;"
| 2010-06-10 || Loss ||align=left| Singtongnoi Por.Telakun || Suek Onesongchai, Rajadamnern Stadium || Bangkok, Thailand || Decision || 5 || 3:00
|-
|-  style="background:#cfc;"
| 2010-05-07 || Win ||align=left| Mongkolchai Kwaitonggym || Suek Petchpiya, Lumpinee Stadium || Bangkok, Thailand || KO (Punch) || 4 || 
|-
|-  style="background:#fbb;"
| 2010-02-11 || Loss ||align=left| Singtongnoi Por.Telakun || Suek Petthongkam, Rajadamnern Stadium || Bangkok, Thailand || Decision || 5 || 3:00
|-
|-  style="background:#cfc;"
| 2009-12-23 || Win ||align=left| Sittisak Petpayathai || Suek Sor. Sommai, Rajadamnern Stadium || Bangkok, Thailand || KO (Left Uppercut) || 2 || 
|-
|-  style="background:#cfc;"
| 2009-11-28 || Win ||align=left| Albert Veera Chey || A1 Lyon || Lyon, France || Decision || 5 || 3:00
|-
! style=background:white colspan=9 |
|-
|-  style="background:#cfc;"
| 2009-10-01 || Win ||align=left| Sittisak Petpayathai || Suek Daorungchujaroen, Rajadamnern Stadium || Bangkok, Thailand || Decision || 5 || 3:00
|-
! style=background:white colspan=9 |
|-  style="background:#fbb;"
| 2009-08-06 || Loss ||align=left| Nong-O Sit Or || Ratchadamnern vs Lumpini Fights, Rajadamnern Stadium || Bangkok, Thailand || Decision || 5 || 3:00
|-
|-  style="background:#cfc;"
| 2009-06-21 || Win ||align=left| Kaew Fairtex || M-1 Fairtex Muay Thai Challenge || Differ Ariake, Japan || Decision || 5 || 3:00
|-
|-  style="background:#cfc;"
| 2009-06-01 || Win ||align=left| Sagetdao Phetphayathai || Daorungchujaroen Fights, Rajadamnern Stadium || Bangkok, Thailand || Decision || 5 || 3:00
|-
|-  style="background:#cfc;"
| 2009-04-30 || Win ||align=left| Fahmai Skindewgym || Suek Daorungchujaroen Fights, Rajadamnern Stadium || Bangkok, Thailand || Decision || 5 || 3:00
|-
|-  style="background:#fbb;"
| 2009-03-06 || Loss ||align=left| Petchboonchu FA Group || Suek Krikkrai Fights, Lumpinee Stadium || Bangkok, Thailand || Decision || 5 || 3:00
|-
|-  style="background:#cfc;"
| 2009-01-18 || Win ||align=left| Atom Yamada || WBC Muaythai Event || Beijing, China || Decision || 5 || 3:00
|-
|-  style="background:#cfc;"
| 2008-12-22 || Win ||align=left| Phet-Asawin Seesanferry || Rajadamnern Stadium || Bangkok, Thailand || KO (Liver Shot) || 3 || 
|-
|-  style="background:#cfc;"
| 2008-11-13 || Win ||align=left| Sagetdao Phetphayathai || Jarumueang Fights, Rajadamnern Stadium || Bangkok, Thailand || Decision || 5 || 3:00
|-
|-  style="background:#c5d2ea"
| 2008-10-02 || Draw ||align=left| Petto Sitjaophor || Suek Daorungchujaroen, Rajadamnern Stadium || Bangkok, Thailand || Decision Draw || 5 || 3:00
|-
|-  style="background:#cfc;"
| 2008-08-22 || Win ||align=left| Sagetdao Phetphayathai || Suek Eminentair, Lumpinee Stadium || Bangkok, Thailand || Decision || 5 || 3:00
|-
|-  style="background:#cfc;"
| 2008-07-31 || Win ||align=left| Anuwat Kaewsamrit || Daorungchujarern Fights, Rajadamnern Stadium || Bangkok, Thailand || Decision (Unanimous) || 5 || 3:00
|-
! style=background:white colspan=9 |
|-
|-  style="background:#cfc;"
| 2008-07-01 || Win ||align=left| Tuktatong Chengsimiewgym || Suek Saengmorakot, Lumpinee Stadium || Bangkok, Thailand || Decision (3-2) || 5 || 3:00
|-
|-  style="background:#cfc;"
| 2008-06-02 || Win ||align=left| Chok Eminentair || Daorungchujarern Fights, Rajadamnern Stadium || Bangkok, Thailand || Decision || 5 || 3:00
|-
|-  style="background:#cfc;"
| 2008-04-28 || Win ||align=left| Sagetdao Phetphayathai || Daorungchujarern Fights, Rajadamnern Stadium || Bangkok, Thailand || Decision || 5 || 3:00
|-
|-  style="background:#fbb;"
| 2008-03-04 || Loss ||align=left| Sagetdao Phetphayathai || Kiatphet Fights, Lumpinee Stadium || Bangkok, Thailand || Decision || 5 || 3:00
|-
|-  style="background:#cfc;"
| 2008-01-31 || Win ||align=left| Samsamut Kiatchongkhao || Jarumueang Fights, Rajadamnern Stadium || Bangkok, Thailand || TKO || 2 || 
|-
|-  style="background:#fbb;"
| 2007-12-20 || Loss ||align=left| Chalermdeth Infinity || Daorungchujarern Fights, Rajadamnern Stadium || Bangkok, Thailand || Decision || 5 || 3:00
|-
|-  style="background:#fbb;"
| 2007-11-29 || Loss ||align=left| Loh-ngern Pitakkruchaidan || Kai Yang Har Dao Tournament, 1st Round || Thailand || Decision || 5 || 3:00
|-
|-  style="background:#fbb;"
| 2007-10-11 || Loss ||align=left| Saenchai Sor Kingstar || Lumpinee Stadium || Bangkok, Thailand || Decision (Unanimous) || 5 || 3:00
|-
|-  style="background:#cfc;"
| 2007-08-02 || Win ||align=left| Jaroenchai Kesagym || Rajadamnern Stadium || Bangkok, Thailand || Decision || 5 || 3:00
|-
|-  style="background:#cfc;"
| 2007-06-21 || Win ||align=left| Lerdsila Chumpairtour || Rajadamnern Stadium || Bangkok, Thailand || Decision || 5 || 3:00
|-
|-  style="background:#fbb;"
| 2007-05-22 || Loss ||align=left| Singdam Kiatmoo9 || Wanboonya Fights, Lumpinee Stadium || Bangkok, Thailand || Decision || 5 || 3:00
|-
|-  style="background:#cfc;"
| 2007-03-29 || Win ||align=left| Ronnachai Naratreekun || Rajadamnern Stadium || Bangkok, Thailand || Decision || 5 || 3:00
|-
|-  style="background:#fbb;"
| 2007-02-14 || Loss ||align=left| Orono Tawan || S.Sommay Fights, Rajadamnern Stadium || Bangkok, Thailand || Decision || 5 || 3:00
|-
|-  style="background:#cfc;"
| 2007-01-18 || Win ||align=left| Nongbee Kiatyongyut || Kiatyongyut Fights, Rajadamnern Stadium || Bangkok, Thailand || Decision || 5 || 3:00
|-
|-  style="background:#c5d2ea"
| 2006-12-21 || Draw ||align=left| Anuwat Kaewsamrit || Birthday Show, Rajadamnern Stadium || Bangkok, Thailand || Decision Draw || 5 || 3:00
|-
|-  style="background:#cfc;"
| 2006-11-16 || Win ||align=left| Anuwat Kaewsamrit || Rajadamnern Stadium || Bangkok, Thailand || Decision || 5 || 3:00
|-
! style=background:white colspan=9 |
|-
|-  style="background:#cfc;"
| 2006-10-05 || Win ||align=left| Lerdsila Chumpairtour || Daorungchujaroen Fights, Rajadamnern Stadium || Bangkok, Thailand || Decision || 5 || 3:00
|-
|-  style="background:#cfc;"
| 2006-09-04 || Win ||align=left| Ronnachai Naratrikun || Daorungchujaroen Fights, Rajadamnern Stadium || Bangkok, Thailand || Decision || 5 || 3:00
|-
! style=background:white colspan=9 |
|-
|-  style="background:#cfc;"
| 2006-08-11 || Win ||align=left| Yuthajak Kaewsamrit || Sor Phumpanmoung Fights, Lumpinee Stadium || Bangkok, Thailand || TKO || 4 || 
|-
|-  style="background:#fbb;"
| 2006-07-05 || Loss ||align=left| Saenchainoi Nongkeesuwit || Onesongchai Promotion, Rajadamnern Stadium || Bangkok, Thailand || Decision || 5 || 3:00
|-
|-  style="background:#c5d2ea"
| 2006-05-18 || Draw ||align=left| Lerdsila Chumpairtour || Daorungchujarean Fights, Rajadamnern Stadium || Bangkok, Thailand || Decision Draw || 5 || 3:00
|-
|-  style="background:#cfc;"
| 2006-04-11 || Win ||align=left| Sarawut Lukbanyai || Phetburapha Fights, Lumpinee Stadium || Bangkok, Thailand || Decision || 5 || 3:00
|-
|-  style="background:#cfc;"
| 2006-03-06 || Win ||align=left| Singtongnoi Por.Telakun || Wansongchai Fights, Rajadamnern Stadium || Bangkok, Thailand || Decision || 5 || 3:00
|-
|-  style="background:#cfc;"
| 2006-01-25 || Win ||align=left| Phet-Ek Kiatyongyut || Daorungchujarean Fights, Rajadamnern Stadium || Bangkok, Thailand || Decision || 5 || 3:00
|-
|-  style="background:#cfc;"
| 2005-12-19 || Win ||align=left| Lerdsila Chumpairtour || Daorungchujarean Fights, Rajadamnern Stadium || Bangkok, Thailand || Decision || 5 || 3:00
|-
|-  style="background:#fbb;"
| 2005-11-02 || Loss ||align=left| Ronnachai Naratrikoon || Daorungchujarean Fights, Rajadamnern Stadium || Bangkok, Thailand || Decision || 5 || 3:00
|-
|-  style="background:#cfc;"
| 2005-09-19 || Win ||align=left| Sayannoi Kiatprapat || Daorungchujarean Fights, Rajadamnern Stadium || Bangkok, Thailand || Decision || 5 || 3:00
|-
|-  style="background:#cfc;"
| 2005-08-04 || Win ||align=left| Singtongnoi Por.Telakun || Daorungchujarean Fights, Rajadamnern Stadium || Bangkok, Thailand || Decision || 5 || 3:00
|-
|-  style="background:#fbb;"
| 2005-06-30 || Loss ||align=left| Seanchainoi Seandeatgym || Jarumuang Fights, Rajadamnern Stadium || Bangkok, Thailand || Decision || 5 || 3:00
|-
|-  style="background:#cfc;"
| 2005-05-30 || Win ||align=left| Watcharachai Kaewsamrit || Daorungchujarean Fights, Rajadamnern Stadium || Bangkok, Thailand || Decision || 5 || 3:00
|-
|-  style="background:#cfc;"
| 2005-04-27 || Win ||align=left| Saengathit Sasiprapa Gym || Daorungchujarean Fights, Rajadamnern Stadium || Bangkok, Thailand || Decision || 5 || 3:00
|-
|-  style="background:#cfc;"
| 2005-03-30 || Win ||align=left| Seanchai Jirakrengkri || Jarumueang Fights, Rajadamnern Stadium || Bangkok, Thailand || Decision || 5 || 3:00
|-
|-  style="background:#fbb;"
| 2005-03-03 || Loss ||align=left| Chalermkiat Kiatpakin || Daorungchujarean Fights, Rajadamnern Stadium || Bangkok, Thailand || Decision || 5 || 3:00
|-
|-  style="background:#fbb;"
| 2005-01-26 || Loss ||align=left| Saengathit Sasiprapa Gym || Sukdaorungchujaroen Promotion, Rajadamnern Stadium || Bangkok, Thailand || Decision || 5 || 3:00
|-
|-  style="background:#fbb;"
| 2004-12-23 || Loss ||align=left| Singpayak Khetrangsii || Daorungchujarean Fights, Rajadamnern Stadium || Bangkok, Thailand || Decision || 5 || 3:00
|-
|-  style="background:#cfc;"
| 2004-11-29 || Win ||align=left| Seangartid Sasiprapagym || Daorungchujarean Fights, Rajadamnern Stadium || Bangkok, Thailand || Decision || 5 || 3:00
|-
|-  style="background:#cfc;"
| 2004-11-06 || Win ||align=left| Gohsuke Kikuchi || Titans 1st || Kitakyushu, Japan || Decision (Unanimous) || 3 || 3:00
|-
|-  style="background:#cfc;"
| 2004-09-30 || Win ||align=left| Deatsak S.Thumpet || Daorungchujarean Fights, Rajadamnern Stadium || Bangkok, Thailand || Decision || 5 || 3:00
|-
|-
! style=background:white colspan=9 |
|-  style="background:#cfc;"
| 2004-09-06 || Win ||align=left| Saengathit Sasiprapa Gym || Daorungchujarean Fights, Rajadamnern Stadium || Bangkok, Thailand || Decision || 5 || 3:00
|-
|-  style="background:#cfc;"
| 2004-07-29 || Win ||align=left| Berkreak Pinsinchai || Jarumueang Fights, Rajadamnern Stadium || Bangkok, Thailand || Decision || 5 || 3:00
|-
|-  style="background:#cfc;"
| 2004-04-29 || Win ||align=left| Petcheak S.Tarntawan || Daorungchujarean Fights, Rajadamnern Stadium || Bangkok, Thailand || Decision || 5 || 3:00
|-
|-  style="background:#c5d2ea"
| 2004-04-01 || Draw ||align=left| Paenyai Sitkaewprapon || Daorungchujarean Fights, Rajadamnern Stadium || Bangkok, Thailand || Decision Draw || 5 || 3:00
|-
|-  style="background:#cfc;"
| 2004-03-03 || Win ||align=left| Tewarit Mueangsurin || Jarumueang Fights, Rajadamnern Stadium || Bangkok, Thailand || Decision || 5 || 3:00
|-

See also 
List of male kickboxers

References

1989 births
Living people
Featherweight kickboxers
Jomthong Chuwattana
Jomthong Chuwattana
Kunlun Fight kickboxers
Jomthong Chuwattana
Super-featherweight boxers